Nick Ovett (born 4 January 1967) is a British luger. He competed at the 1988 Winter Olympics and the 1992 Winter Olympics. His brother, Steve, won a gold and bronze medal at the 1980 Summer Olympics.

References

External links
 

1967 births
Living people
British male lugers
Olympic lugers of Great Britain
Lugers at the 1988 Winter Olympics
Lugers at the 1992 Winter Olympics
Sportspeople from Brighton